The University of Mostar is the largest public university located in Mostar, Bosnia and Herzegovina.

Previously it was called the University Džemal Bijedić of Mostar, named after a socialist politician Džemal Bijedić.

The university has ten faculties and one Academy of Fine Arts, with 50 majors, 46 specialisations and 70 study groups. This makes the University of Mostar one of the most diverse universities in the country.

History

The roots of the university date back to 1895 when the Franciscan theological school was established. In 1950 Higher teacher-training school started with its work in Mostar. Then follows establishment of higher technical school in 1959, higher agricultural school in 1960, Departments of the Faculties of Law and Economics.

The university was established in Mostar in 1977 and faculties and higher schools function further on as its part. From 1992 the Croatian language is the official language at the University of Mostar. The University of Mostar is the only Croatian speaking university in Bosnia and Herzegovina, with around 1,000 employees. There are ten faculties, academy of fine arts, eight institutes and the student center within the university.

The University of Mostar participates in Rectors' Conference of Bosnia and Herzegovina and it is also an associate member of the Croatian Rectors' Conference. The university seal shows the building of the Franciscan monastery.

During the Bosnian War, at the end of 1992, the university was renamed as Sveučilište u Mostaru (the Croatian term for University), and adopted the Croatian language as official one. As the city became divided on ethnic lines, Bosniak professors left the university, and established a new one with the old name - the University Džemal Bijedić of Mostar. Since the buildings of the university were situated in western Mostar, under the control of the Croats, the new university used the old Yugoslav People's Army (JNA) barracks in eastern Mostar. The University Džemal Bijedić now maintains a campus in eastern Mostar.

On 7 and 8 February 2019 University was the host of the Third Rector's Forum of the Southeastern Europe and Western Balkans which followed the first forum in Novi Sad, the second in Zagreb and preceded the fourth one in Podgorica. Representatives of over 30 institutions from the region attended the event.

Organisation and administration

Students
The University of Mostar has around 16,000 students, which makes it the third largest university in Bosnia and Herzegovina. Through years, the University of Mostar saw rapid growth in number of students. In the academic year of 2006–07, it had 6,256 students, while in 2014–15 it had 10,712 students.

The number of foreign students, of whom the vast majority are from neighbouring Croatia, is also growing. In the academic year of 2008–09, there were 292 students from Croatia, while in 2012–13 there were 644. In 2014–15, students from Croatia comprised 17% of the total student population.

See also
 Balkan Universities Network
 List of universities in Bosnia and Herzegovina
 Education in Bosnia and Herzegovina
 University Džemal Bijedić of Mostar
 List of split up universities

References

External links
 Official Website

Universities in Bosnia and Herzegovina
Universities and colleges in Mostar
Mostar
1977 establishments in Yugoslavia